Childersburg is a city in Talladega County in the U.S. state of Alabama. It was incorporated in 1889. At the 2020 census, the population was 4,754. It has a history dating back before 1540, when it was noted as a village of the Coosa Nation visited by the Spanish explorer Hernando de Soto. It is said a member of De Soto’s crew fell ill and was left to settle in the area of present day Childersburg where the Coosa people cared for the ill explorer.

Geography
Childersburg is located at  (33.275187, −86.353166).

The city is located along the Coosa River in western Talladega County along US Routes 280 and 231. US 280 and 231 run northwest to southeast through the city, leading northwest 7 mi (11 km) to Harpersville, where they split, and US 280 continues 37 mi (60 km) to Birmingham. US 231/280 also run southeast 11 mi (18 km) to Sylacauga. Alabama Route 76 also runs through the city, leading east 10 mi (16 km) to Winterboro and southwest 7 mi (11 km) to Alabama Route 25 near Wilsonville.

Climate

History
Successive indigenous peoples had lived in the area for thousands of years. In the 16th century, people identified as part of the Kymulga-phase culture (of the larger Mississippian culture) lived at Talisi, the former site of Childersburg. In the fall of 1540, the Spanish explorer Hernando de Soto's expedition rested here for about one month during its exploration of the Southeast. Childersburg is the "oldest occupied settlement in America”  The Abihka people (part of those who became known as the Muskogee or Creek) dominated the area by the 18th century.

The Alabama Army Ammunition Plant, a munitions plant, was established in Childersburg in 1941 and operated throughout World War II until August 1945. Operated by DuPont, the plant produced explosives, such as nitrocellulose, trinitrotoluene (TNT), and dinitrotoluene (DNT). The plant also secretly produced heavy water to support the Manhattan Project. In 1940 the town had about five hundred people. Over fourteen thousand workers came to build and later operate the new facility.

Demographics

2000 census
At the 2000 census, there were 4,927 people living in the city, an increase over the 1990 population of 4,600. In 2000, there were 1,999 households and 1,419 families in the city. The racial makeup of the city was 68.87% White, 29.73% Black or African American, 0.32% Native American, 0.06% Asian, 0.02% Pacific Islander, 0.26% from other races, and 0.73% from two or more races. 0.61% of the population were Hispanic or Latino of any race.

Of the 1,999 households 32.7% had children under the age of 18 living with them, 49.2% were married couples living together, 17.8% had a female householder with no husband present, and 29.0% were non-families. 27.4% of households were one person and 13.7% were one person aged 65 or older. The average household size was 2.46 and the average family size was 2.98.

The age distribution was 27.0% under the age of 18, 9.3% from 18 to 24, 26.4% from 25 to 44, 22.1% from 45 to 64, and 15.3% 65 or older. The median age was 36 years. For every 100 females, there were 84.1 males. For every 100 females age 18 and over, there were 78.6 males.

The median household income was $23,932 and the median family income  was $30,524. Males had a median income of $31,892 versus $20,569 for females. The per capita income for the city was $15,412. About 20.7% of families and 23.8% of the population were below the poverty line, including 33.6% of those under age 18 and 19.9% of those age 65 or over.

2010 census
At the 2010 census, there were 5,175 people, 2,090 households and 1,422 families in the city. The racial makeup of the city was 60.1% White, 36.9% Black or African American, 0.4% Native American, 0.5% Asian, 0.0% Pacific Islander, 0.3% from other races, and 1.8% from two or more races. 1.3% of the population were Hispanic or Latino of any race.

Of the 2,090 households 29.7% had children under the age of 18 living with them, 41.3% were married couples living together, 22.4% had a female householder with no husband present, and 32.0% were non-families. 28.8% of households were one person and 11.9% were one person aged 65 or older. The average household size was 2.48 and the average family size was 3.04

The age distribution was 26.4% under the age of 18, 9.6% from 18 to 24, 24.9% from 25 to 44, 24.0% from 45 to 64, and 15.1% 65 or older. The median age was 36.5 years. For every 100 females, there were 82.5 males. For every 100 females age 18 and over, there were 79.8 males.

The median household income was $38,310 and the median family income  was $41,646. Males had a median income of $43,333 versus $25,450 for females. The per capita income for the city was $20,221. About 14.8% of families and 14.2% of the population were below the poverty line, including 18.4% of those under age 18 and 24.8% of those age 65 or over.

2020 census

As of the 2020 United States census, there were 4,754 people, 2,175 households, and 1,284 families residing in the city.

Recreation
There are ten golf courses in Childersburg and its immediate vicinity.

Childersburg is home to the Childersburg Tigers.  1967, 1977, 2002, and 2007 Alabama Baseball State Champions.  Childersburg has won numerous youth baseball state championships including Cal Ripken, Babe Ruth and most recently (2013) American Legion.

DeSoto Caverns is also located in Childersburg.

Notable people
 L. Zenobia Coleman (1898–1999) - librarian
 Walton Cruise, professional baseball player
 Joshua B. Lee, represented Oklahoma as a United States representative from 1935 to 1937 and United States senator from 1937 to 1943
 Robert Lee Rowe, mayor of Melbourne, Florida from 1927 to 1932
 A. J. Smitherman (1885–1961), lawyer, businessman and editor of the black-owned newspaper, Tulsa Star, which documented the Tulsa race massacre.
Gerald Wallace, professional basketball player
 Zelous Wheeler, professional baseball player

Gallery

Transportation
Intercity bus service is provided by Greyhound Lines.

References

External links

 
 Childersburg Chamber of Commerce
 DeSoto Caverns Park

Cities in Alabama
Cities in Talladega County, Alabama